Biotechnology is the use of living systems and organisms to develop or make products.

It may also refer to:
Biotechnology engineering
Biotechnology High School, a public high school in Freehold Township, New Jersey
Biotechnology Industry Organization, an American trade organization 
Biotechnology Heritage Award, recognizes individuals who have made significant contributions to the development of biotechnology